Sportsklubben Nessegutten is a multi-sports club from Levanger, Norway. It has divisions for football, athletics, handball, orienteering, skiing, speed skating, tennis and artistic gymnastics. It was founded on 20 April 1929.

The football club reached the quarter-finals of the 1959 Norwegian Football Cup. After drawing Viking FK at Ullevaal Stadion, the team lost 0–4 against Viking at Lerkendal Stadion, with nearly 25,000 spectators, most of which were from Innherred. Nessegutten merged their elite football group with IL Sverre in 1996 to create Levanger FK.

References

Official site

Association football clubs established in 1929
Football clubs in Norway
Sport in Trøndelag
Levanger
1929 establishments in Norway